Mat' can refer to:

 Latin-script transliteration of the original Russian-language title of Vsevolod Pudovkin's 1926 film Mother.
 Mat (Russian profanity)